Garnet McCallum Bloomfield (8 April 1929 – 1 August 2018) was Canadian politician and farmer by career, who was a member of the Liberal Party of Canada and the House of Commons of Canada.

He represented the London—Middlesex electoral district after winning that riding in the 1980 federal election. His previous attempt to win the riding in 1979 was unsuccessful.

Bloomfield served only in the 32nd Canadian Parliament before his defeat in 1984 federal election by Terry Clifford of the Progressive Conservative party. He also campaigned at the riding in the 1988 federal election but was again unsuccessful against Clifford, losing by only 8 votes.

After switching membership to the Reform Party, he contested the 1997 federal election in the Perth—Middlesex electoral district but lost to the Liberal and Progressive Conservative candidates there. The same result occurred when he campaigned again in Perth—Middlesex in the 2000 federal election as a candidate for the Canadian Reform Conservative Alliance.

External links
 

1929 births
2018 deaths
Members of the House of Commons of Canada from Ontario
Liberal Party of Canada MPs
People from Middlesex County, Ontario